Henry Moyo (born 8 February 1972) is a Malawian former long distance runner who competed in the 1996 Summer Olympics.

References

1972 births
Living people
Malawian male long-distance runners
Olympic athletes of Malawi
Athletes (track and field) at the 1996 Summer Olympics